One Percent More Humid is a 2017 American drama film written and directed by Liz W. Garcia. The film stars Juno Temple, Julia Garner, Alessandro Nivola, Maggie Siff, Olivia Luccardi and Philip Ettinger.

Plot

Catherine and Iris, who were childhood friends, are returning home from college to a hot and humid New England summer. They’re filling their days and nights with parties, skinny-dipping and rekindling old relationships. But when a shared trauma from their past becomes increasingly difficult to suppress, a wedge between the two grows, and each begin to pursue forbidden love affairs.

Cast  
 Juno Temple as Iris
 Julia Garner as Catherine
 Alessandro Nivola as Gerald
 Maggie Siff as Lisette
 Olivia Luccardi as Mae
 Philip Ettinger as Billy
 Mamoudou Athie as Jack
 Liz Larsen as Catherine's Mother
 Jack DiFalco as Reynolds
 Ricky Goldman as Alex

Release
The film premiered at the Tribeca Film Festival on April 21, 2017.

References

External links
 
 

2017 films
2017 drama films
American drama films
2010s English-language films
2010s American films